The 2021 Rugby Europe Women's Sevens Conference was held in Belgrade from 4 to 6 June 2021, the tournament was a multi-pool phase competition. It was played in three phases, with the final ranking after pool phase 3. Israel won the tournament and Monaco made their international debut.

Teams 

 Israel
 Luxembourg
 Austria
 Bulgaria
 Latvia
 Monaco
 Lithuania
 Croatia
 Andorra

Standings

Tournament

Pool Phase 1

Pool A

Pool B

Pool C

Pool Phase 2

Pool D

Pool E

Pool F

Pool Phase 3

Pool G

Pool H

Pool I

References 

2021
2021 rugby sevens competitions